Bradford Bulldogs are an English ice hockey team that play in the NIHL North Two (Laidler) Division of the English National Ice Hockey League. They play their home games at the Bradford Ice Arena, Bradford, West Yorkshire. They were formed in 1978. Many of the team were born and taught to play ice hockey in and around the Bradford area. 
The club also features a thriving junior system youth system which begins at under-10 level through to Under-18s, in terms of teams, but anyone from the age of six-years-old upwards is able to take part in beginners sessions which are held at Bradford Ice Arena every Wednesday, starting at 5.30pm and costing just £5.

After the 2020-21 season was cancelled because of the ongoing coronavirus pandemic, the Bulldogs returned to action in 2021-22 competing in the NIHL North Two (Laidler) Division.
They also have teams at Under-18, Under-16, Under-14, Under-12 and Under-10 level.
Over the years, the club has produced a number of players through its junior system who have gone on to play at senior level elsewhere in the UK. Several were signed to the Leeds Knights roster for the 2021-22 NIHL National campaign. These included forwards, Kieran Brown and Adam Barnes, as well as defenders Bobby Streetly, Lewis Baldwin and Jordan Griffin. 
Brown and Griffin both served 'apprenticeships' at Sheffield Steelers after being signed by former head coach Paul Thompson - Brown in 2017 and Griffin in 2018. Liam Kirk and Cole Shudra - the latter a Knights' team-mate of Brown and Griffin during 2021-22 - were two other players to be signed up on this innovative scheme.

Club roster 2022-23
(*) Denotes a Non-British Trained player (Import)

2021/22 Outgoing

References

Bradford Bulldogs website

Ice hockey teams in England